Ruaidhrí Mear Ua Dubhda was King of Ui Fiachrach Muaidhe.

Ruaidhrí Mear was a son of Taichleach mac Niall Ua Dubhda. No dates exist for his reign, but Araile do fhlathaibh Ua nDubhda places him between Aodh mac Muirchertach Ua Dubhda (died 1143) and An Cosnmhaidh Ua Dubhda, called him ri o Roba go Codnuigh("king from [the rivers] Roba to Codhnach").

External links
 http://www.ucc.ie/celt/published/T100005A/

References

 The History of Mayo, Hubert T. Knox, p. 379, 1908.
 Genealach Ua fFiachrach Muaidhe, 263.8 (pp. 596–97), 264.5 (pp. 598–99); Araile do fhlathaibh Ua nDubhda/Some of the princes of Ui Dhubhda, pp. 676–681; Leabhar na nGenealach:The Great Book of Irish Genealogies, Dubhaltach Mac Fhirbhisigh (died 1671), eag. Nollaig Ó Muraíle, 2004–05, De Burca, Dublin.

People from County Sligo
Monarchs from County Mayo
12th-century Irish monarchs
Year of death unknown
Year of birth unknown